Isengard is a solo project of Fenriz, the drummer of Darkthrone, created in 1989.

It is rooted on Norwegian black/Viking metal and experimental rock on some tracks, and named after the large fortress Isengard in J. R. R. Tolkien's The Lord of the Rings book series.

History
The person/creature in Isengard's logo was taken from an old Lord of the Rings RPG called Middle-earth Role Playing. The original illustration represents Thuringwethil, the vampire from Tolkien's book The Silmarillion.

Fenriz created Isengard because he had many musical ideas that did not fit in with the style and music of Darkthrone. Fenriz performed all instruments and vocals himself. Vinterskugge is a compilation of three demos recorded before the full-length album Høstmørke was recorded.

When asked how he felt about Isengard in a November 2007 interview, Fenriz commented that he does not "understand why people like it so much". He stated that people like "the elements" which he doesn't like, namely the project's folk metal aspect.

In 2016, Peaceville Records issued a two-song 7" entitled "Traditional Doom Cult". Its A-side, "The Light", was recorded in 1989 whereas the B-side "The Fright" was recorded in the early 1990s.

A third Isengard album entitled "Vårjevndøgn" was released in October 2020, consisting of unreleased recordings from 1989 to 1993.

Discography
 Spectres over Gorgoroth (demo, 1989)
 Horizons (demo, 1991)
 Vandreren (demo, 1993)
 Vinterskugge (compilation, 1994)
 Høstmørke (1995)
 Traditional Doom Cult (2016)
 Vårjevndøgn  (2020)

References

Norwegian black metal musical groups
Norwegian folk metal musical groups
Music based on Middle-earth
Musical groups established in 1989
1989 establishments in Norway
Musical groups disestablished in 1995
1995 disestablishments in Norway
Musical groups from Oslo
Things named after Tolkien works